"Can't Breathe" is a 2010 song by Fefe Dobson.

Can't Breathe may also refer to:
 Can't Breathe (Boiler Room album), a 2000 album
 "Can't Breathe" (Boiler Room song), a 2000 song
 "Can't Breathe" (Cyndi Lauper song), a  song
 "Can't Breathe" (Disciple song), a 2001 song
 "Can't Breathe" (Herd song), a 2005 song
 "Can't Breathe" (Leona Lewis song), a 2009 song
 "Can't Breathe" (Southern Sons song), a 1992 song
 "Can't Breathe" (Tanya Stephens song), a 2004 song
 "Can't Breathe" (U-KISS song), a  song

See also
 "Can't Breathe Anymore", a 2004 song by TNT
 Can't Breathe Without You (disambiguation)
 Dad, I Can't Breathe, a 1995 album by the Boils
 I Can't Breathe (disambiguation)
 "I Can't Breathe Anymore", a 1978 song by David Gilmour
 "I Just Can't Breathe...", a 2010 song by the Brilliant Green